Weymouth is an unincorporated community in Medina County, in the U.S. state of Ohio.

History
The community was named after Weymouth, Massachusetts, the native home of an early settler.  A post office called Weymouth was established in 1824, and remained in operation until 1905. By the 1880s, Weymouth had a cheese factory and several country stores.

References

Unincorporated communities in Medina County, Ohio
Unincorporated communities in Ohio